Dame Grace Hilda Cuthbertha Ross  (née Nixon; 6 July 1883 – 6 March 1959), known as Hilda Ross, was a New Zealand politician for the National Party and an activist.

Early years
Nixon was born at Auckland to Adam (a fireman who later became a marine engineer) and Zillah (Johnson) Nixon. Her family lived in both Sydney and Auckland, and she received her education in these cities. She trained as a music teacher and later conducted the Hamilton City Choral Operatic Society.

Family
In 1904, she married Harry Campbell Manchester Ross (died 1940) in Auckland. Her husband founded a furnishing company, "Barton and Ross". They had four sons, two of whom died in infancy The twins were born in 1907, survived only a few days, but were baptized Allan and Richard. Her two surviving sons were, Norman and Colin.

Political career

Her first elected posts were the Waikato Hospital Board (1941) and the Hamilton Borough Council (1944). She was Deputy Mayor of Hamilton in 1945. As MP she held various posts in the First National Government, including Member of the Executive Council (1949–1957), Minister of Social Security (1957), Minister of Welfare of Women and Children (1949–1957), and Minister of Child Welfare (1954–1957).

Later life
In 1952, she was appointed as a Commander of the Order of St John. Ross was appointed a Dame Commander of the Order of the British Empire in the 1956 New Year Honours. She died on 6 March 1959 in Hamilton.

Quote
"The Country is today enjoying so much prosperity that married women with children should wake up to their responsibilities in the home and stay at home".

Legacy
Dame Hilda Ross Memorial Arts Centre & Dame Hilda Ross Memorial Arts Centre Appeal
 A statue of Ross was erected in Hamilton in 2020.

Gallery

See also

List of New Zealand politicians
List of members of the New Zealand Parliament who died in office

Notes

References

Women in Parliamentary Life 1970–1990: Hocken Lecture 1993 by Marilyn Waring, page 34–35 (Hocken Library, University of Otago, 1994) 

1883 births
1959 deaths
New Zealand Dames Commander of the Order of the British Empire
New Zealand National Party MPs
Members of the Cabinet of New Zealand
People from Auckland
People from Hamilton, New Zealand
Women government ministers of New Zealand
Local politicians in New Zealand
Members of the New Zealand House of Representatives
New Zealand MPs for North Island electorates
20th-century New Zealand women politicians
20th-century New Zealand politicians
Women members of the New Zealand House of Representatives
Deputy mayors of places in New Zealand
Hamilton City Councillors